Harold Tafler Shapiro (born June 8, 1935) is an economist and university administrator. He is currently a professor of economics and public affairs at the Princeton School of Public and International Affairs at Princeton University. Shapiro served as the president of University of Michigan from 1980 to 1988 and as the president of Princeton University from 1988 to 2001.

Biography
Born to a Jewish family in Montreal, Quebec, Shapiro attended Lower Canada College, a prestigious independent school in Montreal which was at that time boys-only.  He earned his B.Comm., with honors, from McGill University  in 1956 and his Ph.D. from Princeton University in 1964, both in the field of economics. His doctoral dissertation was titled "The Canadian monetary sector: an econometric analysis."

Shapiro's parents owned the famous Ruby Foo's in Montreal. After his father's untimely death, the restaurant was passed down to him and his twin brother, Bernard, who would later become the first Ethics Commissioner of Canada and 14th principal of McGill University.  Shapiro managed the restaurant while studying economics at McGill University, where he also began graduate school until he moved to Princeton University.

He joined the faculty of the University of Michigan as assistant professor of economics in 1964.  He held a variety of academic and administrative appointments, including as chairman of its department of economics and vice-president for academic affairs, until his selection as president of that university in 1980.  He was president of Michigan until he left to become president of Princeton University in 1988. As Princeton's president, Shapiro oversaw the largest increase in the university endowment in the history of the school.  Shapiro was elected Fellow of the American Academy of Arts and Sciences and a member of the American Philosophical Society in 1990. He announced his retirement from the presidency of Princeton in fall 2000 to take effect in June 2001. Shirley Tilghman, his successor, took office on June 15 of the following year.

Shapiro continues to live in Princeton, and is professor emeritus in the departments of economics and public policy at the university. He is trustee emeritus of the Institute for Advanced Study. His present academic interests include bioethics, on which he writes extensively. Shapiro chaired the National Bioethics Advisory Commission during President Bill Clinton's second term. He also sits on the boards of a number of prominent ventures, including the for-profit HCA (founded by the Frist family, which donated the Frist Campus Center to Princeton), and the non-profit Alfred P. Sloan Foundation and Robert Wood Johnson Medical School. He is a fellow of the Hastings Center, an independent bioethics research institution. He also served on the United States Olympic Committee for a number of years, and was a director of Dow Chemical Company.

His fields of specialization in economics include econometrics, science policy, and the evolution of postsecondary education.  He is author of several books, including A Larger Sense of Purpose: Higher Education and Society (Princeton University Press, 2005).  In 2000, Shapiro received the Council of Scientific Society Presidents Citation for Outstanding Leadership.  In 2008, he was awarded the Clark Kerr Medal for Distinguished Leadership in Higher Education, presented annually by the University of California-Berkeley Academic Senate.  He also received the William D. Carey Award for leadership in Science Policy from the American Association for the Advancement of Science..

Personal life
Shapiro has been married to Vivian Shapiro for 53 years. Together they have four children: Anne, Marilyn, Janet and Karen.  They also have 11 grandchildren.  Vivian was a practicing psychologist and earned her PhD. His daughter, Janet, is a professor of psychology and the dean of the Graduate School of Social Work at Bryn Mawr College. His daughter, Karen, is the chief administrative officer of the Rutgers School of Health Professions.

References
 Official website, with C.V.

1935 births
Living people
Presidents of Princeton University
Presidents of the University of Michigan
Canadian university and college chief executives
Jewish Canadian scientists
Scientists from Montreal
McGill University Faculty of Management alumni
Princeton University alumni
Princeton University faculty
University of Michigan faculty
Hastings Center Fellows
Trustees of the Institute for Advanced Study
Members of the European Academy of Sciences and Arts
Canadian economists
Members of the American Philosophical Society
Members of the National Academy of Medicine